Kristian Torve (born 11 March 1993) is a Norwegian politician for the Labour Party.

He served as a deputy representative to the Parliament of Norway from Sør-Trøndelag during the term 2017–2021. Hailing from Oppdal, he has been a member of Sør-Trøndelag county council.

References

1993 births
Living people
People from Oppdal
Deputy members of the Storting
Labour Party (Norway) politicians
Sør-Trøndelag politicians